Todaka is a Japanese surname. Notable people with the surname include:

, Japanese boxer
, Japanese footballer
, composer for Nintendo

Japanese-language surnames